Per Linguam is a peer-reviewed academic journal published by Stellenbosch University. It covers topics related to language learning and applied language studies and has more recently started including a focus on multilingualism and educational psychology. The issue of multilingualism, in particular, has been identified as an important issue in South Africa.

History 
Per Linguam was established in 1985. The current editor-in-chief is Christa van der Walt.

See also 
 Language education

References

External links 
 

Linguistics journals
Publications established in 1985
English-language journals
Biannual journals
Stellenbosch University
1985 establishments in South Africa